Harrisina is a genus of moths of the family Zygaenidae.

Species
 Harrisina americana – grapeleaf skeletonizer (Guérin-Méneville, [1832])
 Harrisina aversus (H. Edwards, 1884)
 Harrisina brillians (Barnes & McDunnough, 1910)
 Harrisina coracina (Clemens, 1860)
 Harrisina cyanea (Barnes & McDunnough, 1910)
 Harrisina guatemalena (Druce, 1884)
 Harrisina lustrans (Beutenmüller, 1894)
 Harrisina metallica – western grapeleaf skeletonizer (Stretch, 1885)
 Harrisina mystica (Walker, 1854)
 Harrisina rumelii (Druce, 1884)

References
 Harrisina at Markku Savela's Lepidoptera and Some Other Life Forms

Procridinae
Taxa named by Alpheus Spring Packard
Zygaenidae genera